Kızıltepe can refer to:

 Kızıltepe
 Kızıltepe, Ezine
 Kızıltepe, Maden
 Kızıltepe, Osmancık

 Cansel Kiziltepe (born 1975), German politiciam